Emily Bernstein is a professor at Mount Sinai School of Medicine known for her research on RNA interference, epigenetics, and cancer, especially melanoma.

Education and career 
Bernstein received her B.S. from McGill University in 1998 and earned a Ph.D. from Stony Brook University in 2003. Following her Ph.D. she was a postdoctoral researcher at Rockefeller University where she worked with David Allis. In 2008 she moved to Mount Sinai School of Medicine where, as of 2022, she is a professor in the department of oncology and dermatology.

Research 
Bernstein is known for her research on RNA interference, epigenetics, and cell development.  Her early research examined the enzyme Dicer, its role in cell development in mice, and RNA interference. While a postdoctoral researcher she examined linkages between non-coding RNA and chromatin and DNA methylation. Subsequently, she has worked on histones, gene silencing, and tumor cell development. In 2022 her team discovered alterations to a gene which can lead to melanoma.

Selected publications 

</ref>

Awards and honors 
In 2014 Bernstein received a young investigators award from the Pershing Square Foundation.

References

External links 
 
 , May 14, 2016

Living people
McGill University alumni
Stony Brook University alumni
Icahn School of Medicine at Mount Sinai faculty
Women medical researchers
Cancer researchers
Year of birth missing (living people)